Yakutpura (Urdu - یاقوت پورہ; Telugu - యాకుత్పురా) is a traditional and district of the Old City, Hyderabad in Telangana state, India. With a population of 6,335 inhabitants, the size of the area is about 0.37 square kilometers.

Named by the Nizam of Hyderabad, the word Ya·kut (yä-koot), from Yakutpura, is derived from the Persian word Yakut meaning the precious stone "ruby." 

Hyderabad is known as the "City of Pearls". During the era of the 7th Nizam (Mir Osman Ali Khan), the Hyderabad State was a business market of gems and pearls. Yakutpura was one of the parts of the Nizam's State and hence its name was coined. A part of Yakutpura is also called Brahmin-wadi where Brahmins live.

Commercial area

Yakutpura is one of the largest areas of the Old City. It is situated close to the historic sites of Charminar and Mecca Masjid. Yakutpura is connected to Dabeer Pura through one of the oldest bridges (flyover) in Hyderabad. In addition, the area is well connected to public transports, as it is home to a MMTS train station. The local language is Telugu, but Hindi and English are commonly spoken and understood. Yakutpura is also close to the Bibi ka Alawa, HEH Nizam's Museum, and Salarjung Museum.

Yakutpura comes under the South Zone of Hyderabad. The South Zone, also called Old City or Purana Shahar, is a shopping area. Most of Hyderabad's historical sights are in the South Zone. Other areas in the South Zone include Charminar, Patthargatti, Afzalgunj, Shalibanda, Falaknuma, Dabirpura, and Purani Haveli.

Mumtaz Ahmed Khan was a previous MLA of Yakutpura. The current MLA is Ahmed Pasha Quadri.

Hospitals and public health

Apart from numerous clinics, there are few hospitals located in Yakutpura, including one of the city's oldest children's hospitals the Durru Shehvar Children's & General Hospital. Princess Esra Hospital at MoghulPura, Owaisi Hospital at Chandrayangutta, and Osmania Hospital at Afzal Gunj are all nearby.

Entertainment
One of the oldest movie theaters in Hyderabad, known as the "Yakut Mahal Deluxe", is located here and shows old Hindi movies, though screenings have been affected by the COVID-19 pandemic. Another theatre, named "Suraj Talkies" was closed and replaced with a new hotel

Localities in Yakutpura

Azmath Nagar
Aman Nagar
Brahmanwadi (Gandhi Bomma)
Bada Bazaar
Bhavani Nagar
Chandra Nagar
Talab Katta
Murad Mahal
Zafar Road
Rein Bazar
Ganga nagar (Rehal Kamaan)
Maddanapet
Edi Bazar
Sheikh Faiz Kaman
Yakutpura Station Road
Bagh-E-Jahan Ara
SRT Colony
Murtuza Nagar
Qasim colony
Chowni Nade Ali Baig
Wahed Colony
Dewdi Suryar Jung
Al Jabri Colony
Pathar Ka Makaan

Areas around Yakutpura

 Dabirpura
 Purani Haveli
 Alijah Kotla
 Saidabad
 Chanchalguda

Public transport

Yakutpura is connected by buses run nearby TSRTC. Buses are 82 and 77. There is a MMTS train station at Yakutpura.

References

 Neighbourhoods in Hyderabad, India